Violeta Bermúdez Valdivia (born 12 August 1961) is a Peruvian lawyer, writer and diplomat. On 18 November 2020, Bermúdez became the Prime Minister of Peru. Previously, she held positions in the United States Agency for International Development and worked during the cabinets of President Alejandro Toledo and Prime Minister Beatriz Merino.

Political career
From April 1997 to January 2002, she served as the Human Rights Coordinator of the United States Agency for International Development representing Peru.

Bermúdez was appointed as Vice-Minister of the Ministry of Women's Promotion and Human Development on 24 January 2002 by President Alejandro Toledo. She had a role in gaining the approval of policies at the Forum of Equity and Social Justice of the National Agreement.

In July 2003, she was Chief of the Cabinet of Advisors to Prime Minister Beatriz Merino. She left the position a few months later in December.

Between 2012 and 2017, she was Director of the Pro-Decentralization Project for the United States Agency for International Development.

Prime Minister 
On 18 November 2020, President Francisco Sagasti appointed Bermúdez as Prime Minister of Peru. She replaced Ántero Flores Aráoz following the growing social unrest in the country. She is the fifth woman to hold this position in the country's history.

Personal life
She was born in Lima. Bermúdez studied law at the National University of San Marcos and at the Pontifical Catholic University of Peru.

She is married to lawyer Samuel Abad Yupanqui.

Publications
La regulación jurídica del aborto en América Latina y el Caribe: estudio comparativo (1998)
Gender and power. The Political Equality of Women (2019)

References

External links
 Violeta Bermúdez, una defensora de las mujeres en la PCM at La Republica

1961 births
Living people
Prime Ministers of Peru
National University of San Marcos alumni
Peruvian women lawyers
Writers from Lima
Women prime ministers
21st-century Peruvian women politicians
21st-century Peruvian politicians
20th-century Peruvian lawyers